Hentz, Reid & Adler was an architectural firm that did work in the U.S. state of Georgia.  The firm is "known in the Southeast for their Beaux-Arts style and as the founding fathers of the Georgia school of classicism."

The partnership Hentz & Reid  included Hal Fitzgerald Hentz (1883-1972) and Joseph Neel Reid (1885-1926).  Rudolph S. Adler became a partner in 1913.  In 1927, after Reid’s death in 1926, Philip T. Shutze became partner in 1927 and the firm became known as Hentz, Adler & Shutze.

Several of their works are listed on the National Register of Historic Places (NRHP).

Works

Atlanta
 140 Peachtree Street NE (1911, lower three floors remain), Downtown- currently house downtown offices of the Atlanta Historical Society
J. Mack Robinson College of Business Administration Building (listed under a previous name, "Citizen's and Southern Bank Building"), a.k.a. the "Empire Building", 35 Broad St. (Hentz,Adler & Shutze), NRHP-listed
Jacob's drugstore, 886 (now 810) N. Highland Ave. NE, Virginia-Highland
Paramount Theater (orig. Howard Theater), Peachtree St., between Ellis and Houston (demolished 1960)
Peachtree Southern Railway Station, 1688 Peachtree St., NW, Brookwood  (Hentz, Reid & Adler), NRHP-listed
Reid House Condominiums (1924), 1325 Peachtree St. NE, Midtown
Rich's department store flagship (1924), Broad St., South Downtown
Henry B. Tompkins House, built 1922,  125 W. Wesley Rd., NW., Atlanta (Hentz,Reid & Adler), NRHP-listed
Swan House, home of Edward and Emily Inman, Built in 1924. Now part of Atlanta History Center, NRHP-listed

Rest of Georgia
Athens: Harold Hirsch Hall, University of Georgia School of Law (Hentz, Adler & Shutze)
Cedartown: Hawkes Children's Library, N. College St. (Hentz,Reid & Adler), NRHP-listed
Columbus: Robert E. Dismukes Sr., 1617 Summit Dr. (Hentz,Reid & Adler), NRHP-listed
Griffin: St. George's Episcopal Church, 132 N. Tenth St. (Hentz, Reid, and Adler), NRHP-listed
Macon:
Massee Apartments (1924), 347 College St.
Villa Albicini, 150 Tucker Rd. (Hentz,Reid & Adler), NRHP-listed

Outside Georgia
310 West Church Street Apartments, 420 N. Julia St., Jacksonville, Florida (Hentz,Reid & Adler), NRHP-listed

References

Architecture firms based in Georgia (U.S. state)